Dmitry Semyonovich Yaparov (born 1 January 1986) is a Russian cross-country skier.

Career
He represented Russia at the 2014 Winter Olympics in Sochi. On 16 February he ran the first (classical) leg in the men's team relay, together with his team mates Aleksandr Bessmertnykh, Alexander Legkov and Maxim Vylegzhanin. They originally won a silver medal. In November 2017, his results at the 2014 Winter Olympics were annulled due to doping violations by his teammates. On 1 February 2018, their results were restored as a result of the successful appeal.

Cross-country skiing results
All results are sourced from the International Ski Federation (FIS).

Olympic Games
1 medal – (1 silver)

World Championships

World Cup

Season standings

Individual podiums

1 podium – (1 )

Team podiums

 2 victories – (1 , 1 ) 
 3 podiums – (2 , 1 )

References

1986 births
Russian male cross-country skiers
Tour de Ski skiers
Cross-country skiers at the 2014 Winter Olympics
Olympic cross-country skiers of Russia
People from Mozhga
Living people
Competitors stripped of Winter Olympics medals
Olympic silver medalists for Russia
Sportspeople from Udmurtia